Ammoconia caecimacula is a moth of the family Noctuidae. It is found in most of Europe, except southern Spain, Great Britain, Ireland and northern Fennoscandia. It is also present in Anatolia, western Turkestan and across the Palaearctic to Siberia.  In the east the species is represented by subspecies transcaucasica and sibirica.

The wingspan is 35–48 mm. Adults are on wing from August to October or November.

The larvae feed on various plants, including Cephalanthera damasonium, Rumex, Galium, Scrophularia, Genista, Taraxacum and Silene. They prefer the flowers and fruit.

Subspecies
Ammoconia caecimacula caecimacula
Ammoconia caecimacula transcaucasica Ronkay & Varga, 1984
Ammoconia caecimacula sibirica Staudinger, 1882

References

External links 

Fauna Europaea
Lepiforum.de
 schmetterlinge-deutschlands.de
Vlindernet.nl 

Xyleninae
Moths described in 1775
Moths of Europe
Moths of Asia
Taxa named by Michael Denis
Taxa named by Ignaz Schiffermüller